Kunchan (born 14 November 1952) is an Indian actor, primarily concentrating on Malayalam films. He has done over 650 films in Malayalam. He usually does minor roles. He has also done important character roles. He started his career when Malayalam films were made in black and white. He made his debut with Tamil film Manaivi (1969), which went unreleased, and his first release was Rest House released in 1970. His most remembered roles were in films like Ivar (1980), Nayakan (1985), Avanazhi (1986), Carnivel (1989) Aye Auto (1990), Kottayam Kunjachan (1990), and Lelam (1997). Recently he has also done Kamal Haasan' s Manmadhan Ambu.

Personal life

Kunchan was born as Mohan Das as the second among five children to Krishnan and Oolamma at Fort Kochi on 14 November 1952. He had three brothers and a sister. He had his primary education from T. D. High School, Mattancherry, Kochi.

Kunchan married Shoba on 28 April 1985. She owns a beauty parlor, "Live In Style", at Kochi. The couple has two daughters, Swetha and Swathi.

Filmography

Malayalam

 Daham (1965)
 Madatharuvi (1967)
 Rest House (1969)
 Raktha Pushpam (1970)
 Lanka Dahanam (1971) as Mohan
 Rathri Vandi (1971)
 Sambhavami Yuge Yuge (1972) as Dressmart Propriater 
 Taxi Car (1972)
 Maasappadi Maathupilla (1973)
 Chenda (1973)
 Thekkankaattu (1973) as Chari
 Ajnathavasam (1973) as Payyan
 Panchavadi (1973) as Narayana Pilla
 Chandrakantham (1974) 
 Sapthaswarangal (1974)
 Panchathanthram (1974) as Shanto
 Bhoogolam Thiriyunnu (1974)
 Rahasya Rathri (1974) 
Chattambikkalyaani (1975) as Chotta Sulthan
 Kalyana Panthal (1975)
 Bharya Illatha Rathri (1975)
 Prayaanam (1975)
 Sathyathinte Nizhalil (1975)
 Pravaham (1975) as Radhakrishnan
 Criminals (Kayangal) (1975)
 Chief Guest (1975)
 Kottaram Vilkkanundu (1975)
 Mucheettu Kalikkarante Makal (1975)
 Aaranya Kaandam (1975)
 Chumaduthaangi (1975)
 Cheenavala (1975) as Madhu
 Amma (1976)
 Aayiram Janmagal (1976) as Mohandas
 Ajayanum Vijayanum (1976)
 Kamadhenu (1976) as Shankunni Nair
 Varadakshina (1977)
 Aanandam Paramaanandam (1977)
 Rathimanmadhan (1977)
 Shankupushppam (1977) as Govindan
 Anugraham (1977) as Padmalojanan
 Ormakal Marikkumo (1977) as Pappu
 Aadya Padam (1977)
 Muttathe Mulla (1977) as Supran
 Randu Lokam (1977) as Kuttan
 Urakkam Varatha Rathrikal (1978) as Kuttappan
 Velluvili (1978)
 Padmatheertham (1978) as Rameshan
 Amarsham (1978)
 Tharoo Oru Janmam Koodi (1978)
 Itha Oru Manushyan (1978) as Potti
 Mattoru Karnan (1978)
 Adavukal Pathinettu (1978)
Kaathirunna Nimisham (1978) as Pottan
 Asthamayam (1978)
 Randil Onnu (1978)
 Mudramothiram (1978) as Baiju
 Bandhanam (1978)
 Valeduthavan Valal (1979)
 Agni Vyooham (1979)
 Yakshippaaru (1979)
 Indradhanussu (1979) as Kuttappan
 Arattu (1979)
 Ankakkuri (1979)
 Aavesham (1979) as Chammunni
 Adhikaaram (1980) as Ramu
 Shakthi (1980)
 Karimbana (1980)
 Chakara (1980) as Narayanan
 Ivar (1980)
 Angadi (1980)
 Air Hostess (1980)
 Chandra Bimbam (1980)
 Kolilakkam (1981)
 Sambhavam (1981)Swarangal Swapnagal (1981) as Thankamani
 Thusharam (1981)
 Sankarsham (1981) as Shishupalan
 Orikkal Koodi (1981)
 Avatharam (1981)Thadavara (1981) as Vaasu
 Dhwantha Yudham (1981)
 Ahimsa (1981)
 Thuranna Jail (1982) as Thankappan
 Aayudham (1982)
 Shila (1982) as Babu
 Amrita Geetham (1982) as Mani
 Kurukkante Kalyanam (1982)
 Kakka (1982)
 Aa Divasam (1982)
 Mandanmmar Londanil (1983) as Prabhakaran
 Attakalasham (1983)
 Father Damien (1983)
 Rathilayam (1983) as Thankappan
 Parasparam (1983) as Sudheer Kumar
 Rugma (1983)
 Ankam (1983) as Chinnan
 Ente Kadha (1983) as Charley
 Bookambam (1983)Swapname Ninakku Nandi (1983) as Mallan
 Ponthooval (1983)
 Engine Nee Marakkum (1983)
 Sree Krishna Parundu (1984)
 Swantham Sarika (1984) as Rajappan
 Manithali (1984) as Kili 
 Umanilayam (1984) as Rocky
 Engane Undashane (1984)
 Ivide Ingane (1984) as Appukuttan
 Thathamme Poocha Poocha (1984)
 Pavam Poornima (1984) as Porinju
 Onnum Mindatha Bharya (1984) as Hyder
 Njaan Piranna Naattil (1985) as Mental patient
 Nayakan (1985) as Vyas/Vasu
 Puli Varunne Puli (1985)
 Muhurtham 11.30 nu (1985) as Lonappan
 Ambada Njane (1985) as Arjunan
 Chillu Kottaram (1985)
 Oru Sandesham Koodi (1985) as Kunjunni 
 Anubandham (1985)
 Makan Ente Makan (1985)Anakkorumma (1985) as Govindan
 Thammil Thammil (1985)
 Vannu Kandu Kizhadakki (1985)
 Choodatha Pokkal (1985) as Hari
 Upaharam (1985)... Khader
 Idanilangal (1985) as Gopalankutty 
 Yathra (1985)
 Sayam Sandhya (1986)
 Ayiram Kannukal (1986)
 Avanazhi (1986) as Samshayam Vasu
 Ithile Iniyum Varu (1986) as Lawrence
 Rajavinte Makan (1986)
 Nyayavidhi (1986) as Sadaraman
 Naalkkavala (1987)
 Vellanakalude Nadu (1988)
 Chakkikkotha Chankaran (1989)
 Antharjanam (1989) as Kuttappan
 Carnivel (1989)
 Nair Saab (1989)
 Ramji Rav Speaking (1989) Mathai
 Kottayam Kunjachan (1990) Kuttiappan
 His Highness Abdulla (1990)
 Kadathanadan Ambadi (1990)
 Indrajalam (1990)
 Aye Auto (1990) Ramann
 Dr. Pasupathy (1990)
 Meena Bazaar Hindi (1991) as Video Parlor Owner
 Kadalora Kattu (1991) as Adru
 Ganamela (1991) as Shakeer Bal
 Thudarkadha (1991)
 Ulladakkam (1991) as Freddy
 Inspector Balram (1991) as SI Radhakrishnan aka "Shamshyam" Vasu
 Ennodishttam Koodamo (1992)
 Kallan Kappalil Thanne (1992)
 Kamaladalam (1992)
 Kingini (1992)
 Thiruthalvaadi (1992) as Vasu
 Thudarkadha (1991) as Sheshan
 Anaswaram (1991)
 Aparatha (1992) as Abdullah
 Vietnam Colony (1992) as Pattabhiraman
 Vatsalyam (1993) as Divakaran
 Gandharvam (1993) as Mammunju
 Chief Minister K. R. Gowthami (1994)
 Varanamaalyam (1994) as Unnithan
 Manathe Kottaram (1994)
 Puthukottaile Puthumanavalan (1995)
 Highway (1995)
 The King (1995) as Kuruppu
 Lelam (1997) as Kaimal
 Safalam (1997) as Warrier
 Punjabi House (1998) as Thommichen
 The Truth (1998) as Sankaran
 Sathyameva Jayathe (2000) as Police Constable
 Ee Parakkum Thalika (2001) as  Avaran Arakal
 Njan Rajavu (2002)
 Mizhi Randilum (2003) as Vasu
 Sethuramayar CBI (2004) as Krishna Iyer
 Thaskara Veeran (2005) as Raghavan Mashu
 Ananthabhadram (2005)
 Pathaka (2006)... Bapputty
 Pothen Vava (2006) as Panicker
 Thuruppu Gulan(2006)
 Prajapathi (2006) as Nambiar
 Chotta Mumbai (2007) as Philippose
 Annan Thampi (2008)
 Twenty:20 (2008)
 Swantham Lekhakan (2009) as News Reporter
 Nizhal (2010)
 Drona 2010 (2010) as a member of Maniyankottu family
 Three Kings (2011) as himself (Special appearance)
 Christian Brothers (2011) as Driver
 Innanu Aa Kalyanam (2011) as Krishnankutty's father
 Da Thadiya (2012) as Joshua Thadikkaran
 Second Show (2012) as Janardhanan
 The King & the Commissioner (2012) as Kuruppu
 Ustad Hotel (2012) as Driver Abdullah
 Simhasanam (2012) as Pisharodi
 Mumbai Police (2013)
 Ithu Pathiramanal (2013) as Chellapanashari
 Drishyam (2013) as Madhavan
 Salala Mobiles (2014) as the man who wants to buy iPhone
 How Old Are You as Rajeev's father
 Gangster (2014) as Mani Menon
 Acha Dhin (2015) as Gopi
 Kali (2016) as House Owner
 Oppam (2016) as Ganga's father
 Alamara (2017) as Vasu
 Puthan Panam (2017) as Bharathan
 Vimaanam (2017) as Priest
 Panchavarnathatha (2018) as Grandfather
 Ennaalum Sarath..? (2018) as Sarath's father
 An International Local Story (2019) as Rahul's father
 Evidey (2019) as Kabir Kallai
 Finals (2019) as Azees
 Ganagandharvan (2019) as Balan
 Naaradan (2022) as Thomman Varghese
 Maheshum Marutiyum (2023)

Tamil
 Manmadhan Ambu (2010) - Tamil film

TelevisionKadamattathu Kathanar (Asianet)Thumbapoo''(Mazhavil Manorama)

References

External links
 
 http://www.metromatinee.com/artist/Kunjan-170
 http://www.malayalachalachithram.com/profiles.php?i=5718
 Kunchan at MSI

Living people
Male actors from Kochi
Male actors in Tamil cinema
Male actors in Malayalam cinema
Indian male film actors
1952 births
20th-century Indian male actors
21st-century Indian male actors
Indian male television actors
Male actors in Malayalam television
People from Mattancherry